"I Could Be the One" is the fourth and final mainstream single from Stacie Orrico's self-titled second album. It was a limited release (only being released to radio stations in the UK and Poland). It did not fare as well as the first three singles but nonetheless became her fourth top-40 hit in the UK.

Music video
The video for the song was done in the same vein as the "Stuck" video which was also directed by Diane Martel and also featured Orrico's cousin, actor Trevor Wright. The version of the song in the video was slightly longer to the one that appeared on the album, with an extra chorus between the breakdown and third verse. This version, however, has never been commercially available.

Track listings
UK: CD 1
 "I Could Be the One" (album version)
 "Stuck" (acoustic performance)

UK: CD 2
 "I Could Be the One" (album version)
 "Stuck" (Earthlink Live)
 "Tight" (Earthlink Live)
 "I Could Be the One" (video)

Charts

References

 The Original Stacie Orrico Gallery

Stacie Orrico songs
2003 songs
2004 singles
ForeFront Records singles
Music videos directed by Diane Martel
Songs written by Tedd T
Songs written by Stacie Orrico
Virgin Records singles